{{DISPLAYTITLE:C16H28O2}}
The molecular formula C16H28O2 (molar mass: 252.39 g/mol, exact mass: 252.2089 u) may refer to:

 Cioteronel
 Hydnocarpic acid

Molecular formulas